Reconstructions and Recycling is a collection of remixes of music from Bass Communion's album Bass Communion II by leading figures from the experimental, electronic and ambient music scenes. Limited to 1000 copies released on CD by Headphone Dust.

Track listing

Credits

Photography and graphic design by Carl Glover for Aleph
Black and white photographs courtesy John Elgar-Whinney

External links
Bass Communion Site at Steven Wilson Headquarters

Bass Communion albums
2001 remix albums
Burning Shed remix albums